Jaraguá or Jaragua may refer to:

Places
Jaraguá, Goiás, a city in Brazil
Jaraguá do Sul, a city in Santa Catarina State, Brazil
Jaraguá (district of São Paulo), Brazil
Villa Jaragua, a city in the Baoruco province, Dominican Republic
Jaragua, Hispaniola, a cacicazgo in the island of Hispaniola

Sports
Associação Desportiva Jaraguá, a Brazilian futsal club
Arena Jaraguá, an arena in Jaraguá do Sul, Brazil

Other uses
Jaraguá (CPTM), a railway station in the district of Jaraguá in São Paulo, Brazil
Jaragua National Park, a national park in the Dominican Republic
Pico do Jaraguá, a mountain in São Paulo, Brazil
Hyparrhenia rufa or jaragua, a species of grass